Kgomotso Jorry Merahe (born 22 June 1980 in Wesselsbron, Free State) is a South African association football midfielder who played in the Premier Soccer League for Bloemfontein Celtic and Orlando Pirates. He played for African Warriors in the National First Division in the 2008–09 season.

References

1980 births
South African soccer players
Living people
Association football midfielders
Bloemfontein Celtic F.C. players
Orlando Pirates F.C. players
African Warriors F.C. players